Lecithocera daebuensis is a moth in the family Lecithoceridae. It was described by Kyu-Tek Park in 1999. It is found in Korea.

The wingspan is 13.5–15 mm. The forewings are light brown, the costa and hindmargin almost parallel, with sparsely scattered dark brown scales. There are two dark discal spots, the inner one small and round and the outer one large and elongated vertically. The hindwings are grey.

References

Moths described in 2009
daebuensis